Baravand-e Sofla (also Romanized as Barāvand-e Soflá and Barevand-e Soflá; also known as Barāvand-e Pā’īn) is a village in Qalkhani Rural District, Gahvareh District, Dalahu County, Kermanshah Province, Iran. At the 2006 census, its population was 362, in 81 families.

References 

Populated places in Dalahu County